Gayming Magazine are a British, UK-based online LGBTQ video gaming magazine. They are the first video gaming website dedicated to the LGBTQ community.The site was launched in June 2019 with the aim of connecting the LGBTQ and video gaming communities, and has launched virtual Pride events. In 2021, the magazine hosted the world's first LGBTQ+ gaming awards ceremony, Gayming Awards, with the most recent event having taken place in 2022.

In September 2021, Gayming Magazine changed its logo, which moves away from the purely video game-inspired one that launched the magazine in 2019, and updated its mission statement. The logo was developed by queer artist Emma Ensley and will be seen in a multitude of ways as the magazine progresses.

After being appointed Deputy Editor in 2019, Aimee Hart now takes on the mantle of Editor-in-Chief, with a mission to drive the magazine forward broadening out from just video games and becoming the home of queer geek culture.

Gayming Magazine are also debuting their event Gayming LIVE Online in 2022, which aims to bring video games, drag artists and queer culture under one virtual roof.

History 
Gayming Magazine was revealed at the London Games Festival in April 2019. According to founder Robin Gray, the LGBTQ+ community had been a niche of the video gaming community, and they wanted to celebrate that and bring the two communities closer together. The site was launched in June. In September, the site was nominated for a Women in Games Advocacy award. A live event, Gayming Live, was run between 30 September and 5 October, which featured LGBTQ+ gaming artists and journalists, and writers from Fusebox Games offered writing tips. Within its first year it was reported to have a readership of 17,000.

During Summer 2020, Gayming Magazine hosted DIGIPRIDE 2020, a digital Pride event, emphasising the importance of getting through the COVID-19 pandemic and noting that normal Pride events were being cancelled. The site was nominated for another Women in Games award in September 2020.

Gayming Awards

Gayming Awards 2021 
In July 2020, Gayming Magazine hosted the world's first LGBTQ+ gaming awards ceremony, Gayming Awards. Presented by Electronic Arts (EA), the awards were supported by The Association for UK Interactive Entertainment. The first ceremony was held virtually in February 2021 and hosted by Suzi Ruffell. The panel of judges consisted of more than twenty LGBTQ people, though the public voted on the Best LGBTQ+ Streamer and Gayming Magazine Readers’ Awards categories. Voting took place in November and December 2020, with all games released in 2020 being eligible.

The full list of winners of the Gayming Awards 2021 are as follows:

 Game of the Year: Hades
 Gayming Icon Award: Robert Yang
 Gayming Magazine Readers' Award: Hades
 Best LGBTQ Indie Game Award: If Found...
 Industry Diversity Award: I Need Diverse Games
 LGBTQ Streamer of the Year: DEERE
 Best LGBTQ Character Award: Tyler Ronan - Tell Me Why
 Authentic Representation Award: Tell Me Why
 Best LGBTQ Narrative Award: If Found...

The digital-only ceremony was watched by over 150,000 unique viewers around the world, making it the largest LGBTQ+ event on Twitch over the past year.

Gayming Awards 2022 
The Gayming Awards, presented by Twitch, returned in-person in April 2022 and continued to be the first and only global award ceremony celebrating LGBTQ+ video gaming. As before, the ceremony was live streamed on Twitch and IGN and was watched by over 320,000 people in 97 countries around the world.  

2022 saw a new LGBTQ+ Streamer Rising Star Award, as well as categories in Comic Books, Esports and Tabletop Gaming. 

The full list of winners of the Gayming Awards 2022 are as follows:

 Game of the Year: Life Is Strange: True Colors
 Gayming Icon Award: Tanya DePass
 Gayming Magazine Readers' Award: Resident Evil Village
 Best LGBTQ Indie Game Award: Unpacking
 Industry Diversity Award: Ukie’s #RaiseTheGame pledge
 LGBTQ Streamer of the Year: Aimsey
 Best LGBTQ Character Award: Alex Chen, Life Is Strange: True Colors
 Authentic Representation Award: Life Is Strange: True Colors
 LGBTQ Streamer Rising Star Class of ’22: It’s Me Holly, cruuuunchy, CoderGirlChan, AwkwardishPanda, LuciaEverblack and Luke_Boogie
 Best LGBTQ Contribution to Esports: Emi “CaptainFluke” Donaldson
 LGBTQ Tabletop Game Award: Adventuring With Pride: Queer We Go Again
 Best LGBTQ Comic Book Moment: The Pride Omnibus – ComiXology/Dark Horse Comics

Returning Gayming Award categories 
 Game of the Year - Sponsored by PlayStation
 Gayming Magazine Readers’ Award - Sponsored by EA
 Gayming Icon Award - Sponsored by Facebook Gaming
 Industry Diversity Award - Sponsored by Hangar 13 and 2K
 Authentic Representation Award - Sponsored by Marvelous Europe
 Best LGBTQ Character Award - Sponsored by Rocksteady Studios 
 Best LGBTQ Indie Game Award - Sponsored by Xbox
 LGBTQ Streamer of the Year Award - Sponsored by Twitch

New Gayming Award categories for 2022 
 LGBTQ Streamer Rising Star Award - Sponsored by Twitch - This award is to celebrate the success of a rising star of LGBTQ streaming.
 Best LGBTQ Comic Book Moment - Sponsored by Square Enix Mobile - This award recognises the best LGBTQ moment in a comic book in 2021. 
 LGBTQ Tabletop Game Award - This award recognises the best tabletop game with LGBTQ themes.
 Best LGBTQ Contribution to Esports - Sponsored by Esports Technologies - This award recognises the contribution of a person or organisation who has done a significant amount of work in promoting, developing and championing diversity in esports.

The 2022 Awards were also supported by: Green Man Gaming, Bandai Namco, Space Ape Games, UKIE, German Games Industry Association, Out Making Games and London Games Festival.

Gayming LIVE 

Gayming LIVE, an event created by Gayming Magazine, is a convention celebrating all things queer geek culture. The event was due to debut in New York City in Summer 2022, however with COVID still presenting a real risk to large scale events, Gayming chose to listen to and protect their community where the appetite for an in person event was not present. Instead, Gayming LIVE is being turned into a fully virtual event, Gayming LIVE Online. The three-day event will play host to game play streams, panel talks, drag performances, celebrity & voice actor virtual meet & greets, exclusive competitions, indie game festival, virtual marketplace, and more.

Gayming LIVE Online is headlined by Jiggly Caliente, Juice Boxx, and Rock M Sakura, from RuPaul’s Drag Race, as well as Biqtch Puddin’ and Erika Klash from The Boulet Brothers’ Dragula. They will be joined by the co-stars and members of the all-drag Twitch stream team, Stream Queens, plus a stellar line up of LGBTQ games voice actors.

Supporting Gayming LIVE Online are IRL gaymer groups NYC Gaymers, Geeks Out, GaymerX, Qweerty Gaymers, Boston Gaymers, Houston Gaymers, and Chicago Metropolitan Sports Association, member-led communities of LGBTQIA+ gamers.

References

External links
 Official website
 Gayming Magazine to launch in June. Gameindustry.biz. Published 15 April 2019. 
 Gayming Magazine bringing queer perspectives to UK newsstands. pcgamesinsider.biz Published 16 April 2019.
 Gayming Magazine to host first ever Gayming Awards in February 2021. www.pocketgamer.biz Published 21 July 2020

Video game magazines published in the United Kingdom
Magazines established in 2019
Video game websites
Online magazines published in the United Kingdom
2019 establishments in the United Kingdom
LGBT and video games
LGBT-related websites
LGBT-related magazines published in the United Kingdom